Salt & Straw is an ice cream company based in Portland, Oregon. The company was launched in 2011 by cousins Kim Malek and Tyler Malek.

Company history 
Salt & Straw began as a food cart in the Alberta Arts District of Portland, Oregon. Three months later the company opened its first brick-and-mortar location. Since opening in 2011, Salt & Straw has opened three other locations in Portland and offers a home delivery service throughout the US. In order to ship ice cream nationwide delivery, the company packs its ice cream in dry ice and kraft paper. Salt & Straw has locations in  Portland, Eugene, Los Angeles, Anaheim, San Francisco, San Diego, Orlando, Sacramento, Seattle, and Miami.
Salt & Straw is partially owned by film star and wrestler Dwayne "The Rock" Johnson.

List of flavors 

Since opening, Salt & Straw has gained national media attention for its exotic ice cream flavors, some of which are seasonal. Standout flavors, such as Bone Marrow with Bourbon Smoked Cherries and Arbequina Olive Oil, have served as some of the main reasons Salt and Straw has been included on lists of America's best ice cream. Flavors offered at the ice cream shop vary depending on the seasons and ingredient availability, as all main ingredients are locally sourced. A list of regular Salt and Straw flavors follows (though these differ by location):

Sea Salt w/ Caramel Ribbons
Double Fold Vanilla
Chocolate Gooey Brownie
Honey Lavender
Freckled Mint Chocolate Chip (v)
Salted, Malted, Chocolate Chip Cookie Dough
Arbequina Olive Oil
Cinnamon Snickerdoodle
Strawberry Honey Balsamic w/ Black Pepper
Cold Brew Coffee Cashew Praline *West Coast Exclusive
Pear & Blue Cheese *West Coast Exclusive
Marionberry Coconut Sherbet (v) *West Coast Exclusive

In 2015, Salt & Straw partnered each shop with different elementary schools to create flavors designed by children. Stop, Guac & Roll (avocado-vanilla ice cream with cinnamon-sugar-dusted fried tortillas) and Honey Bear (vanilla custard with chocolate honeycomb candy and edible glitter) were two of the flavors created.

In 2016, Salt & Straw developed new flavors from "food waste"—edible by-products of the food production process. New flavors were made with overripe strawberries, spent brewing grains and near-expiration date vegan mayonnaise. Proceeds from the sales of the featured flavors from its Portland stores ($3,000) were donated to Urban Gleaners, a Portland nonprofit. Salt & Straw creates little food waste or scraps, because its products are frozen. When an item is no longer offered on its menu, any leftover ice cream is donated to a nonprofit.

In 2022, on National Ice Cream Day, the company introduced edible perfume as an ice-cream enhancement. Malek worked with Imaginary Authors to create cocoa, citrus and floral scents that can be spritzed on scoops.

References

External links 

 

2011 establishments in Oregon
American companies established in 2011
Ice cream parlors in the United States
Restaurants in Portland, Oregon
Richmond, Portland, Oregon
Ice cream brands
Food and drink companies established in 2011